The Funeral Sciences is the debut album by Schoolyard Heroes. It was released in 2003 on Control Group/TCG. All songs are written by Schoolyard Heroes.

Track listing
 "Curse of the Werewolf" – 3:14
 "All-You-Can-Eat Cancer" – 3:54
 "The Mechanical Man vs. the Robot From the Outer Limits" – 2:09
 "Dawn Of The Dead" – 2:45
 "Blood-Spattered Sundress" – 2:45					
 "Attack of the Puppet People" – 2:49
 "Bury the Tooth of the Hydra and a Skeleton Army Will Arise" – 3:19
 "The Klaw" – 2:21	
 "Michael Dudakoff: American Ninja" – 3:32					
 "Contra" – 2:01
 "Boyfriend" – 2:43				
 "Sincerely Yours, Jonathan Harker" – 5:24

2003 debut albums
Schoolyard Heroes albums